Miss Universe Mongolia is a beauty competition annually held in Ulaanbaatar since 2018, main purpose is to select Mongolian representative for Miss Universe. The winner 2018 Dolgion Delgerjav. The winner 2019 Gunzaya Baterdene

History
Mongolia has been organizing  Miss Mongolia beauty pageant since 2001.In 2018 former Vice President of Miss Mongolia       Anh Bayar became an official license holder of Miss Universe beauty pageant in Mongolia.

Broadcasters
NTV (2018—present)

Titleholders

International pageants

Miss Universe Mongolia

Miss Universe Mongolia has created in Mongolia in 2018. On occasion, when the winner does not qualify (due to age) for either contest, a runner-up is sent.

References 

Miss Universe by country
Beauty pageants in Mongolia
Recurring events established in 2018
2018 establishments in Mongolia
Mongolian awards